April Elizabeth Ross (born June 20, 1982) is an American beach volleyball player and three-time Olympic medalist. She won a silver medal at the 2012 Summer Olympics with Jennifer Kessy, a bronze medal at the 2016 Summer Olympics with Kerri Walsh Jennings, and a gold medal at the 2020 Summer Olympics with Alix Klineman. Ross and Kessy were also the 2009 Beach Volleyball World Champions.

Early life
Ross grew up in Newport Beach, California, where she attended Newport Harbor High School. At NHHS, in addition to lettering in track, she was a star indoor volleyball player, eventually becoming the nation's top recruit for her graduating class. She won the Gatorade National Player of the Year award as a senior and was the California Interscholastic Federation (CIF) Player of the Year in 1998 and 1999. In her senior season, she notched 624 kills and 526 digs. She played club volleyball for Orange County Volleyball Club for five years. She also played on the U.S. Junior National Team.

Personal life
April is the daughter of Glen and Margie Ross, and has a sister - Amy Ross. She married men’s beach volleyball player Bradley Keenan in 2010. They divorced in 2018. Ross got engaged to Josh Riley in summer 2022.

College
Ross played indoor volleyball during her collegiate career, where she attended the University of Southern California in Los Angeles. In her freshman season she was the Pac-10 Freshman of the Year as well as the National Freshman of the Year. Additionally, she received Pac-10 First Team honors as well as AVCA Second Team All-America honors. She helped USC to the NCAA Final Four.

As a sophomore in 2001, she was a second team All American and finished the season ranked fourth in Pac-10 in kills (3.98 kpg), sixth in points (4.52 ppg) and seventh in digs (3.04 dpg) and helped USC to the NCAA Regional Finals, when she suffered a sprained ankle during game two and was forced to leave the match.

In her final two seasons, she helped USC to back-to-back NCAA Titles. In 2002, she was named a First Team All-American and had 15 kills and 14 digs in the NCAA Championship win over Stanford, avenging their only loss of the season to the Cardinal. In 2003, she repeated as a First Team All-American, and helped USC to an undefeated season after defeating Florida in the NCAA championship match. Ross had 14 kills and 19 digs in the winning effort.

She finished her career among USC's all-time career record-holders, ranking in the top 6 in eight statistical categories, including first in points (1,430) and points per game, second in service aces (161) and service aces per game (0.38), fourth in attacks (3,859), fifth in kills (1576), kills per game (3.73) and digs (1,296) and sixth in digs per game (3.06).

In 2004, she won the Honda Sports Award as the nation's top female collegiate volleyball player.

Career

Professional career
In 2008, with her beach partner Jennifer Kessy during the Swatch FIVB World Tour 2008, they finished in third place at the ConocoPhillips Grand Slam Stavanger, second place at the Dubai Open and first place at the Phuket Thailand Open, where she was named the Most Outstanding Player. On September 7, 2008, Ross and Kessy upset the World No. 1 duo of Misty May-Treanor and Kerri Walsh at an AVP tournament in Santa Barbara, California.  On July 4, 2009, Kessy and Ross won the FIVB World Championships in Stavanger, Norway defeating Brazilians Juliana Felisberta Silva and Larissa Franca. As of April 2012, Ross had eight AVP and nine FIVB 1st-place finishes overall, as well as over $937,813 in total prize money.

World tour 2016
Ross played, with partner Walsh Jennings, at the Long Beach, California Grand Slam, which was part of the FIVB Beach Volleyball World Tour.  They won the gold medal in straight sets (21–16, 21–16).

Partnering with Klineman

At the end of 2017, Ross and Alix Klineman became beach volleyball partners. Klineman and Ross won the FIVB Dela Beach Open in January 2018, which was the first tournament they played together. During the 2018 AVP Pro Beach Volleyball Tour, Klineman and Ross won four tournament events: the Austin Open, the Manhattan Beach Open, the Championships (in Chicago), and the Hawaii Invitational. In mid-October 2018, Klineman and Ross won their second FIVB tournament event, earning the gold medal over Brazil at the Yangzhou Open. They were named the AVP Team of the Year at the AVP Award Banquet that November.

In 2019, their success continued as they won the Huntington Beach and New York City Open AVP tour events, and won the FIVB Itapema Open mid-May. They also won the silver medal at the 2019 Beach Volleyball World Championships in Hamburg, Germany.

In July 2020 the two won the AVP Monster Hydro Cup and the Wilson Cup, and in August they won the AVP Champions Cup.

In August 2021, two weeks after winning gold at the Olympics, the pair won the AVP Manhattan Beach Open, their second time winning this tournament together.

Olympic career
In the 2012 London Olympics, No. 4 seed Ross and Kessy won the Silver Medal by defeating Brazil's No. 1 seed team of Juliana and Larissa in a semi-final match after dropping the first set. They lost to teammates Misty May-Treanor and Kerri Walsh Jennings in the Gold Medal final straight sets by an identical score of 16–21.

On June 26, 2013, Ross teamed up with Walsh-Jennings to train for the 2016 Olympics in Rio de Janeiro. Ross played as a defender behind Walsh Jennings' block. Seeded at No. 3, Ross and Walsh Jennings lost to Brazil's No. 2 seed team of Agatha and Barbara in straight sets of 20–22 and 18–21 in a semi-final match. They defeated the No. 1 seed Brazil team of Larissa and Talita in the Bronze Medal match for Ross's second Olympic medal.

On August 6, 2021, Klineman and Ross captured the gold medal in the 2020 Summer Olympics, after winning in straight sets versus Australia. In the entire tournament, they went undefeated in match play, and only lost one set throughout 7 matches. The win allowed Ross to complete the trifecta of winning an Olympic bronze, silver, and gold medal.

Awards

College 

 Honda Sports Award (2004)

FIVB
 FIVB Top Rookie: 2007
 FIVB Best Offensive Player (1): 2009
 FIVB Best Hitter: 2009, 2011
 FIVB Best Server: 2011, 2012, 20152017

AVP
 AVP Rookie of the Year: 2006
 AVP Most Improved Player: 2007
 AVP Best Server: 20132017
 AVP Best Offensive Player: 2013, 2017
 AVP Most Valuable Player: 20132017
 AVP Team of the Year: 2012 (with Jennifer Kessy), 2014, 2016 (with Kerri Walsh Jennings), 2019 (with Alix Klineman).

Clubs
  Leonas de Ponce (2004–2006)
 Orange County Volleyball Club for 5 Years

References

External links

 
 
 
 2009 FIVB World Championship recap
 

1982 births
Living people
American women's volleyball players
American women's beach volleyball players
Beach volleyball defenders
Beach volleyball players at the 2012 Summer Olympics
Beach volleyball players at the 2016 Summer Olympics
Olympic beach volleyball players of the United States
Olympic medalists in beach volleyball
Medalists at the 2012 Summer Olympics
Sportspeople from Newport Beach, California
USC Trojans women's volleyball players
People from Costa Mesa, California
Medalists at the 2016 Summer Olympics
FIVB World Tour award winners
Newport Harbor High School alumni
Beach volleyball players at the 2020 Summer Olympics
Medalists at the 2020 Summer Olympics
Olympic gold medalists for the United States in volleyball
Olympic bronze medalists for the United States in volleyball
Olympic silver medalists for the United States in volleyball
Volleyball players from California
21st-century American women